Lavalette is a census-designated place (CDP) in Wayne County, West Virginia, in the United States. As of the 2010 census, its population was 1,073. Lavalette is located at the intersection of West Virginia Route 152 and West Virginia Route 75, eight miles south of Huntington. The town is near Beech Fork Lake, a popular location for boating and fishing, and Twelvepole Creek.  Lavalette was named after Lavalette Miller, the daughter of a Norfolk & Western Railway official.

Lavalette is a part of the Huntington-Ashland, WV-KY-OH, Metropolitan Statistical Area. As of the 2010 census, the MSA had a population of 287,702.

Lavalette has two 18-hole public golf courses - Sugarwood Golf Club and Creekside Golf Course. Lavalette also has a paid EMS ambulance service with two emergency response squads and one transport unit.  The 35 member volunteer fire department has four engine companies, a rescue boat, and a mobile disaster response trailer.

References

Census-designated places in Wayne County, West Virginia